KOKT-LP (90.9 FM) is a low-power FM radio station licensed to Tulsa, Oklahoma, United States. The station is currently owned by Electron Benders.

History
The station was assigned the call sign KOKT-LP on April 8, 2015. On the website said Welcome We regret to tell you that KOKT is going off the air Saturday, April 6, 2019. We have had a great three-year run. We appreciate the donations that have been received but we haven't raised enough to keep paying music royalties and Internet service. Many thanks to all our listeners! It came back on the air on August 27, 2019.

The station has some significant programming features. Its normal daytime programming is Classic Rock, covering mostly from the 60s to the 80s. From 6 pm to 6 am it airs a nighttime program called Subterrania playing progressive rock. It may be the only extended format playing progressive rock on the US FM dial, aside from limited one-hour shows or similar. Another significant programming feature is that they play all-day blocks by a single artist if they have a concert in Tulsa that night, or in tribute if they have died.

References

External links

http://www.kokt.org

OKT-LP
OKT-LP
Radio stations established in 2016
2016 establishments in Oklahoma